Enrique Molina is the name of:

 Enrique Molina (actor) (1943–2021), Cuban actor
 Enrique Molina (cyclist), Argentine Olympic cyclist
 Enrique Molina (runner) (born 1968), Spanish middle and long distance runner